The Norfolk Punt is a type of yacht, derived from the flat-bottomed gun punts that roamed the Broadland waters in the mid-to-late 19th century. However, at the turn of the 20th century, in order to get to and from the hunting grounds more quickly, the punters developed their highly unstable craft to carry a basic mast and sail for travelling with the wind. It is from these humble beginnings that one of the country's most exciting and powerful racing dinghy classes was born.

If racing in a mixed fleet of classes, the Norfolk Punt receives a Portsmouth number of 879 as a handicap.

Classic or traditional Punts 

The older Punts are still very much in existence today and race in the same fleets as the newer boats. However, due to their rather more antiquated hull designs they compete on a handicap to allow fair racing. Boats designed and built as early as the late 1920s are still regularly seen on the water, with arguably the most successful Punt ever, dating back to 1935, winning four National Championships in the late 80s and just outside the top 3 as recently as 2003.

Amongst the early designers were such famous sailors as Uffa Fox and Jack Holt, although most successful boats were from the drawing boards of local designers, the most prolific being Herbert Woods, Walter Woods, H.T. Percival and W. F. Mollett. Initially gaff rigs were the norm, but as the class entered the 1930s Punt owners adopted Bermuda rigs.

Today many of the early Punts have been lovingly and painstakingly renovated or rebuilt, transformed into varnished works of art. Some have been brought into the 21st century, sporting carbon spars, trapezes and composite sails atop their beautiful, near-century-old clinker hulls. Whatever the owners' personal choices, these older boats are well loved and still very fast, offering near- 29er-type speed in an elegant package.

One-design Punts 

In the eight years immediately after World War II only one boat was built, and it became apparent that the post-World War II economy meant that a new breed of boat needed to be designed, if the class was not to disappear into ignominy. Dick Wyche of Wyche and Coppock designed a  boat made of plywood that proved far cheaper to build and far lighter and faster to sail. This design hustled the class into a new era, with the next 25 boats being built to Dick Wyche's plans, and with the class incorporating the trapeze in the 1960s and offering a fibreglass alternative in the 70s.
In the late 70s the Wyche and Coppock Punt had the distinction of being the fastest dinghy in production.

To this day, the 'hard chine' Punt is a favourite of many, possibly because of its exceptional performance in light to medium conditions, and is still as much in production as ever; of the nine Punts built since 2000, four have been to this design. However, once again owners' preferences have caused rig configurations to vary, from aluminium to carbon spars, single or twin trapezes and symmetric or asymmetric spinnakers.

Development years 

After 32 years of design 'hiatus', the one-design progression of the class was shattered by the return of development. Andy Wolstenholme's prototype double-chine design led the charge, showing just how much faster the Punt could be. This was followed by the most numerically popular of the "Progress" designs, coming from the board of the world-renowned dinghy designer, Phil Morrison, whose cold-moulded modern hull proved to be blisteringly fast with a PY rating of 875.

As with the "hard chine" fleet, rig configurations vary, from aluminium to carbon spars, single or twin trapezes and symmetric or asymmetric spinnakers. These “Progress” designs have traveled the length and breadth of the UK to compete in some of the bigger one-off handicap regattas such as the Grafham Grand Prix, the Bloody Mary, etc. As long as the conditions are appropriate (i.e. no waves), the boats and the sailors acquit themselves favourably against the mainstream competition.

Sources 

 "Norfolk Punts, 1926–2006" by Jamie Campbell, published by Hamilton Publications

External links 

 Norfolk Punt Owners Association
 Norfolk Punt Club

Dinghies